Chalime Giourbouz (born 19 March 1979) is a road cyclist from Greece. She represented her nation at the 2002 UCI Road World Championships.

References

External links
 profile at Procyclingstats.com

1979 births
Greek female cyclists
Living people
Place of birth missing (living people)